Band-e Naqin (also Romanized as Band-e Naqīn; also known as Band-e Naqī and Vand Naqī) is a village in Shahsavan Kandi Rural District, in the Central District of Saveh County, Markazi Province, Iran. At the 2006 census, its population was 62, in 21 families.

References 

Populated places in Saveh County